Aguanil is a municipality in the Brazilian state of Minas Gerais. It was founded on 30 December 1962 and, in 2020, its population was estimated to be 4,522.

Municipalities in Minas Gerais